This is a list of the MPs for Irish constituencies, who were elected at the 1806 United Kingdom general election, to serve as members of the 3rd UK Parliament from Ireland, or who were elected at subsequent by-elections. There were 100 seats representing Ireland in this Parliament.

This was the second United Kingdom general election, as the House of Commons of the 1st Parliament was chosen from the members of the Parliament of Great Britain and the Parliament of Ireland and not by a popular election.

The 3rd United Kingdom Parliament was elected between 29 October and 17 December 1806, as at this period the exact date for the election in each constituency was fixed by the Returning Officer. The Parliament first assembled on 13 December, for a maximum duration of seven years from that date. It was dissolved on 29 April 1807 (a length of four months and sixteen days - the shortest UK Parliament ever).

Summary of results by party (Ireland only)
The names of and votes for candidates at elections are based on Walker. Party labels are based on those used by Stooks Smith and may differ from those in other sources. Many early nineteenth century Irish MPs are not classified by party, by Stooks Smith.

In some cases, when a party label is used for the MP by Stooks Smith in a subsequent Parliament, this is noted in the Members list below.

At the dissolution of the 2nd Parliament, the MPs by party (calculated as above), were
Tory 43, Whig 31, Other (unclassified) 26: Total 100.

The summary results of the 1806 general election, in Ireland, were as follows.

Notes:
 a One Whig and three Tory candidates each contested and won two constituencies. The Right Hon. Maurice Fitzgerald, the Knight of Kerry (Whig) was elected for Kerry and Tralee. He chose to represent Kerry. Sir George Fitzgerald Hill, Bt (Tory) was returned by the boroughs of Coleraine and Londonderry. He decided to represent the latter seat. The Hon. George Knox (Tory) won Dublin University and Dungannon. He decided to sit for Dublin University. Nathaniel Sneyd (Tory) was elected by Cavan and Enniskillen. He retained the Cavan seat. Each candidacy is counted separately in the table.
 b It is possible that there was a petition following the election at Downpatrick, which resulted in Edward Southwell Ruthven (Whig) being unseated and John Wilson Croker (Tory) being declared duly elected. Walker does not refer to this petition, but Stooks Smith mentions one. If this change did take place then there should be one more Tory member and one less Whig at the dissolution.

General election results by constituency

Note:-
 1 Incumbent re-elected

Members by constituency
The list is given in alphabetical order by constituency. The County prefixes used for county constituencies is disregarded in determining alphabetical order, but the county follows any borough or city constituency with the same name.

The name of an MP who served during the Parliament, but who was not the holder of a seat at the dissolution in 1807, is given in italics. When the date of the election is in italics, this indicates a by-election.

A member of the 2nd Parliament, for the same constituency, is indicated by an * before the MPs name. A member of the 2nd Parliament, for a different constituency in Ireland, is indicated by a + before the MPs name.

Supplementary notes:
 a Stooks Smith does not classify this MP by party, in this Parliament, but does in the previous and next Parliaments. It is assumed the party allegiance was the same in this Parliament.
 b Stooks Smith wrongly lists Hon. Montagu James Mathew as a member of the previous Parliament, following a by-election in 1806 caused by Viscount Mathew having succeeded as the 2nd Earl Landaff.

References

 The Parliaments of England by Henry Stooks Smith (1st edition published in three volumes 1844–50), second edition edited (in one volume) by F. W. S. Craig (Political Reference Publications 1973)
 Parliamentary Election Results in Ireland, 1801-1922, edited by B. M. Walker (Royal Irish Academy 1978)

See also
Duration of English, British and United Kingdom parliaments from 1660
List of parliaments of the United Kingdom
List of United Kingdom by-elections (1806-1818)
1806 United Kingdom general election